Aillyidae is a family of air-breathing land snails, terrestrial pulmonate gastropod mollusks in the informal group Sigmurethra.

Aillyidae is the only family in the superfamily Aillyoidea.

This family and the genus is named in honor of Swedish malacologist Adolf d’Ailly (1855-1927).

Taxonomy 
The family Aillyidae is classified within the informal group Sigmurethra, itself belonging to the clade Stylommatophora within the clade Eupulmonata (according to taxonomy of the Gastropoda by Bouchet & Rocroi, 2005). This family has no subfamilies.

Prestonellidae has been tentatively placed as a synonym of Aillyidae in the taxonomy of the Gastropoda by Bouchet & Rocroi, 2005. Herbert & Mitchell (2009) have moved Prestonellidae to the superfamily Orthalicoidea.

Genera 
 Aillya Odhner, 1927 - type genus of the family Aillyidae
 Aillya camerunensis Odhner, 1927 - it lives in Africa

References